BNRR may refer to:

 Birmingham North Relief Road, see M6 Toll
 Burlington Northern Railroad